Albay Bikol, or simply Albayanon is a group of languages and one of the three languages that compose Inland Bikol. It is spoken in the southwestern coast of Albay, (Pio Duran, Jovellar) and northwestern Sorsogon.
The region is bordered by the Coastal Bikol and Rinconada Bikol speakers. The latter is the closest language of Albay Bikol and is mutually intelligible. They are both included in Inland Bikol group of languages.

Albay Bikol is the only sub-group of the Inland Bikol group with several languages with in it. The member languages in this sub-grouping lack stressed syllables, rare, if there is, and that makes them different and unique from other Bikol languages. The said feature of Albay Bikol is comparable to French and Portuguese languages that rarely use stressed syllables.

Dialectal variation

"Were you there at the market for a long time?" translated into Albay Bikol languages, Coastal Bikol and Rinconada Bikol.

See also
Languages of the Philippines

References

External links
Translate Bikol

Bikol languages
Languages of Albay
Languages of Camarines Sur
Languages of Sorsogon